The Mondragon Corporation is a corporation and federation of worker cooperatives based in the Basque region of Spain.

It was founded in the town of Mondragon in 1956 by Father José María Arizmendiarrieta and a group of his students at a technical college he founded. Its first product was paraffin heaters.

It is the seventh-largest Spanish company in terms of asset turnover and the leading business group in the Basque Country. At the end of 2016, it employed 74,117 people in 257 companies and organizations in four areas of activity: finance, industry, retail and knowledge. By 2019, 81,507 people were employed.
Mondragon cooperatives operate in accordance with the Statement on the Co-operative Identity maintained by the International Co-operative Alliance.

History 

In 1941, a young Catholic priest, José María Arizmendiarrieta settled in Mondragón, a town with a population of 7,000 that had not yet recovered from the poverty, hunger, exile, and tension of the Spanish Civil War.
In 1943, Arizmendiarrieta established a technical college which became a training ground for managers, engineers and skilled labour for local companies, and primarily for the co-operatives.

Arizmendiarrieta spent a number of years educating young people about a form of humanism based on solidarity and participation, in harmony with Catholic social teaching, and the importance of acquiring the necessary technical knowledge before creating the first co-operative.

In 1955, he selected five young people to establish the first company of the co-operative and industrial beginning of the Mondragon Corporation. The company was called Talleres Ulgor, an acronym derived from the surnames of Usatorre, Larrañaga, Gorroñogoitia, Ormaechea, and Ortubay, known today as "Fagor Electrodomésticos".

In the first 15 years many co-operatives were established, thanks to the autarky of the market and the awakening of the Spanish economy. During these years, also with the encouragement of Don José María Arizmendiarrieta, the Caja Laboral (1959) and the Social Welfare Body Lagun Aro (1966) were established that played a key role. The first local group was created, Ularco. In 1969, Eroski was founded by merging ten small local consumer co-operatives.

During the next 20 years, from 1970 to 1990, the dynamic continued, with a strong increase in new co-operatives promoted by Caja Laboral's Business Division, the promotion of co-operative associations, the formation of local groups, and the founding of the Ikerlan Research Centre in 1974.

With Spain scheduled to join the European Economic Community in 1986, it was decided in 1984 to establish the "Mondragon Co-operative Group", the forerunner of the current corporation. In-service training for managers was strengthened by creating Otalora, dedicated to training, and the dissemination of co-operatives. The Group consisted of 23,130 workers at the end of 1990.

On the international stage, the aim was to respond to growing globalisation, expanding abroad by establishing production plants in a number of countries. The first was the Copreci plant in Mexico in 1990, followed by many others: up to 73 by the end of 2008, and 122 at the end of 2013. The goals were to increase competitiveness and market share, bring component supply closer to customers' plants, especially in the automotive and domestic appliance sectors, and to strengthen employment in the Basque Country by promoting exports of co-operatives' products by means of new platforms.

Between 2002 and 2007, Fagor and Eroski issued bonds.
While they were commercialized as safe deposits, the courts classed them as riskier debt instruments.
When the yields fell during the financial crisis, bond-holders sued against the cooperatives.

In 2008, the worker-owners of the cooperatives Ampo (metal casting) and Irizar (coaches) voted to leave the corporation.

In October 2009, the United Steelworkers announced an agreement with Mondragon to create worker cooperatives in the United States. On 26 March 2012, the USW, Mondragon, and the Ohio Employee Ownership Center (OEOC) announced their detailed union co-op model.

The industrial sector ended 2012 with a new record of €4 billion in international sales, beating sales figures from before the financial crisis of 2007–2008. Mondragon opened 11 new production subsidiaries. International sales that year accounted for 69% of all sales, a 26% increase from 2009 to 2012, and with 14,000 employees abroad. Mondragon's share in the BRIC markets increased to 20% compared to the previous year. In 2013, international sales grew by 6.7% and accounted for 71.1% of total sales.

On 16 October 2013, domestic appliance company Fagor Electrodomésticos filed for bankruptcy under Spanish law to renegotiate €1,1 billion of debt, after suffering heavy losses during the eurocrisis putting 5,600 employees at risk of losing their jobs. This was followed by the bankruptcy of the whole Fagor group on 6 November 2013. In July 2014, Fagor was bought by Catalonian company Cata for €42.5 million. Cata pledged to create 705 direct jobs in the Basque Country and to continue the brand names Fagor, Edesa, Aspes, and Splendid.

In 2022, the worker-owners of ULMA Group (scaffolding) and Orona (elevators) voted to leave the corporation.
As successful cooperatives they were contributing 10% of their profit to a common fund supporting ailing cooperatives.
They will not contribute to the solidarity fund but they will keep insuring their workers with Lagun Aro and collaborate with Mondragon Unibertsitatea and other cooperatives in the group.

Business culture 
 
Mondragon co-operatives are united by a humanist concept of business, a philosophy of participation and solidarity, and a shared business culture. The culture is rooted in a shared mission and a number of principles, corporate values and business policies.

Over the years, these links have been embodied in a series of operating rules approved on a majority basis by the Co-operative Congresses, which regulate the activity of the Governing Bodies of the corporation (Standing Committee, General Council), the Grassroots Co-operatives and the Divisions they belong to, from the organisational, institutional and economic points of view as well as in terms of assets.

This framework of business culture has been structured based on a common culture derived from the 10 Basic Co-operative Principles, in which Mondragon is rooted: Open Admission, Democratic Organisation, the Sovereignty of Labour, Instrumental and Subordinate Nature of Capital, Participatory Management, Payment Solidarity, Inter-cooperation, Social Transformation, Universality and Education.

This philosophy is complemented by four corporate values: Co-operation, acting as owners and protagonists; Participation, which takes shape as a commitment to management; Social Responsibility, by means of the distribution of wealth based on solidarity; and Innovation, focusing on constant renewal in all areas.

This business culture translates into compliance with a number of Basic Objectives (Customer Focus, Development, Innovation, Profitability, People in Co-operation and Involvement in the Community) and General Policies approved by the Co-operative Congress, which are taken on board at all the corporation's organisational levels and incorporated into the four-year strategic plans and the annual business plans of the individual co-operatives, divisions, and the corporation as a whole.

Wage regulation 

At Mondragon, there are agreed-upon wage ratios between executive work and field or factory work which earns a minimum wage. These ratios range from 3:1 to 9:1 in different cooperatives and average 5:1. That is, the general manager of an average Mondragon cooperative earns no more than 5 times as much as the theoretical minimum wage paid in their cooperative. For most workers, this ratio is smaller because there are few Mondragon worker-owners that earn minimum wages, because most jobs are somewhat specialized and are classified at higher wage levels. The wage ratio of a cooperative is decided periodically by its worker-owners through a democratic vote.

Compared to similar jobs at local industries, Mondragon managers' wages are considerably lower (as some companies pay their best paid managers hundreds of times more than the lowest-paid employee of the company) and equivalent for middle management, technical and professional levels. Lower wage levels are on average 13% higher than similar jobs at local businesses. Spain's progressive tax rate further reduces any disparity in pay. These comparatively low wages can make it very difficult to recruit managers from investor-owned firms.

Business sectors 
Mondragon Corporation operates in four areas: finance, industry, retail, and knowledge, with the latter distinguishing Mondragon from other business groups. In 2013, the corporation posted a total revenue of over €12 billion (roughly US$16 billion), and employed 74,061 workers, making it Spain's fourth-largest industrial and tenth-largest financial group.

Finance 
This area includes the banking business of Laboral Kutxa, the insurance company Seguros Lagun Aro, and the Voluntary Social Welfare Body Lagun Aro, which had an asset fund totaling €5,566 million at the end of 2014. The yield obtained from this fund is used to cover long-term retirement, widowhood, and invalidity benefits, complementary to those offered by the Spanish social security system.

Industry 
The corporation's companies manufacture consumer goods, capital goods, industrial components, products, and systems for construction, and services. The latter includes very diverse business groups such as Abantail: Adaptive design optimization, Alecop: Engineering training, LKS Consultores: Attorneys etc., KREAN: Architects and engineers. MCCTelecom: Telecommunication engineering. Mondragon Lingua: Translation and language schools, Mondragon Sistemas: Automation, Industrial Computing and Telecommunications. Ondoan: Turnkey projects in the energy and environmental sector.
In the leisure and sports area, it manufactures Orbea bicycles, exercise equipment and items for camping, garden and beach.

In capital goods, Mondragon posted a turnover of €976 million in 2009 and is the leading Spanish manufacturer of machining (Danobat Group) and sheet metal forming (Fagor Arrasate Group) machine tools. These machines are complemented by automation and control products for machine tools, packaging machinery, machinery for automating assembly processes and processing wood, forklift trucks, electric transformers, integrated equipment for the catering industry, cold stores, and refrigeration equipment. Specifically focusing on the automotive sector, the corporation also manufactures a wide variety of dies, molds and tooling for casting iron and aluminium, and occupies a leading position in machinery for the casting sector.

In Industrial Components, Mondragon posted a turnover of €1.5 billion in 2009, a sector in which it operates as an integrated supplier for the leading car manufacturers, offering from the design and development of a part to the industrialization and supply of components and assemblies. It has different business units such as brakes, axles, suspension, transmission, engines, aluminium wheel rims, fluid conduction, and other internal and external vehicle components. It also produces components for the main domestic appliance manufacturers in three business areas: white goods, home comfort, and electronics. And it manufactures flanges and pipe accessories for processing oil-gas, petrochemical plants and power generation, copper and aluminium electrical conductors, and components for conveyors.

In construction, sales totaled €974 million in 2009. Mondragon has constructed buildings and important infrastructure projects. It designs and builds large metallic (URSSA), laminated wood and prefabricated concrete structures; supplies prefabricated parts in polymer concrete; offers solutions for formwork and structures (ULMA Group) as well as public works machinery and the industrialization of the construction process, including engineering and assembly services. The ORONA Group produces elevators.

In services to business, sales totaled €248 million in 2008, including business consultancy services, architecture and engineering, property consulting, design and innovation (LKS Group), systems engineering for electromechanical installations, and integrated logistics engineering. It also offers a modern language service, manufactures educational equipment, and provides graphic arts services (mccgraphics S.Coop).

In 2013, 71.1% of turnover came from international sales. Sales resulting from the export of products abroad and production generated in the 122 subsidiaries located in several different countries: China (15), France (17), Poland (8), Czech Republic (7), Mexico (8), Brazil (5), Germany (4), Italy (4), United Kingdom (3), Romania (3), United States (4), Turkey (2), Portugal (2), Slovakia (2), India (5), Thailand (1) and Morocco (1). Overall, in 2013 these 122 plants provided work for more than 11,000 people. The corporate industrial park in Kunshan, close to Shanghai houses seven subsidiaries. In 2012, it opened 11 new subsidiaries abroad, employing around 14,000 people. Its international sales that year marked a record number of 69% of its total sales (€5.8 billion, with a 2% fall compared to the previous year). Mondragon also participated in 91 international R&D projects.

In 2014, the industrial cooperatives created 1,000 jobs, and internationalization continued with 125 production subsidiaries abroad – 3 more than the year before.

Retail 
Mondragon runs Eroski, one of the leading retail groups all over Spain and in southern France, and maintains close contacts with the French group Les Mousquetaires and the German retailer Edeka, with whom it set up the Alidis international purchasing group in 2002. The worker-owners and consumer-members participate in the co-operative's decision-making bodies and management of Eroski. At the end of 2013, Eroski posted a turnover of €6.6 billion, operating 2.069 stores made up of 90 Eroski hypermarkets, 1,211 Eroski/center, Caprabo, Eroski/city, Aliprox, Familia, Onda and Cash & Carry supermarkets, 155 branches of Eroski travel agencies, 63 petrol stations, 39 Forum Sport stores and 221 IF perfume stores. In southern France Eroski had 4 hypermarkets, 16 supermarkets and 17 petrol stations, and 4 perfume stores in Andorra.

Retail includes the food group Erkop, for catering, cleaning, stock-breeding, and horticulture with Auzo Lagun, a co-operative in group catering and cleaning of buildings and premises, and integrated service in the health sector.
In 2008, worker-members voted to expand the cooperative transformation to the retail group as a whole, turning subsidiaries into co-operatives, and making salaried workers worker-members.

Knowledge 
This area has a dual focus: education-training and innovation, which have both been key elements in the development of the corporation. Training-education is mainly linked to the dynamism of Mondragon University, the significant role that Politeknika Ikastegia Txorierri, Arizmendi Ikastola and Lea Artibai Ikastetxea play in their respective areas and the activity of the Management and Co-operative Development Centre Otalora.

Mondragon University is a co-operative university, which combines the development of knowledge, skills, and values, and maintains close relations with business, especially Mondragon co-operatives. Technological innovation is generated through the co-operatives' own R&D departments, the Corporate Science and Technology Plan, the corporation's 12 technology centers and the Garaia Innovation Park.

The 15 technology centers play a fundamental role in the development of the sectors of focus. In 2009 they employed 742 people and had a budget of €53.7 million. In 2013 its network of technology centers and R&D units provided employment for 1,700 people and the commitment to R&D&I matters amounted to 136 million Euros, 8.5% of added value. Mondragon has 479 families of Patents for Inventions, which accounts for 25% patents in the Basque Country, participating in more than 30 R&D cooperation projects at the European level.

Reactions 
In 2012 Richard D. Wolff, an American professor of economics, hailed the Mondragon set of enterprises, including the good wages it provides for employees, the empowerment of ordinary workers in decision making, and the measure of equality for female workers, as a major success and cited it as a working model of an alternative to the capitalist mode of production.

In an April 2012 interview Noam Chomsky said that while Mondragon offers an alternative to capitalism, it was still embedded in a capitalist system which limits Mondragon's decisions:

Vicenç Navarro wrote that from a business perspective, Mondragon is successful in matching efficiency with solidarity and democracy. However, he writes that the number of employees who are not owners has increased more rapidly than worker-owners, to a point that in some companies, for example in the supermarket chains owned by Mondragon, the first is a much larger group than the second. In Navarro's view, this establishes a two-tier system – for example, in terms of whom to save in the case the company collapses. In the collapse of Fagor, the relocation of employees to other companies belonging to Mondragon favored those who were worker-owners, which may affect labor relations:

The Mondragon system is one of four case studies analyzed in Capital and the Debt Trap, which summarized evidence claiming that cooperatives tend to last longer and are less susceptible to perverse incentives and other problems of organizational governance than more traditionally managed organizations.

The founders of Cooperation Jackson, a network of worker cooperatives in Jackson, Mississippi in the United States, cite Mondragon as a key inspiration.

Mondragon in fiction

Works of Kim Stanley Robinson 
In 2312, a science fiction novel by Kim Stanley Robinson, the Mondragon Corporation has evolved into a planned economy system called the Mondragon Accord. The Mondragon Accord is controlled by means of a network of AIs running on quantum computers, and rules large parts of the Solar System, including Mercury and most of the moons of the gas giants; only part of Earth, and its colonies in space, retain remnants of capitalist economies, while Mars has withdrawn from the Accord in the century preceding the story. The Mondragon Corporation already appeared in Robinson's earlier Mars trilogy, as one of the Terran groups involved in the colonization and terraforming of Mars; the coop is also portrayed as the inspiration of both the bogdanovist movement  and the libertarian-leaning Praxis Corporation two of the main forces leading the revolution for the independence of Mars. In Robinson's book The Ministry for the Future, the Mondragon Corporation is introduced in chapter 58 as a model for a future, post-capitalist, cooperative economy.

See also 

 Cecosesola, association of cooperatives in Venezuela
 Distributism
 Horizontalidad
 John Lewis Partnership
 List of worker cooperatives
 Workers' self-management

References

Further reading 
 Azurmendi, Joxe 1984: El hombre cooperativo
Spanish white goods company Fagor seeks protection from creditors (October 2013)
  Thousands of Fagor employees demand in Mondragon town to keep their jobs (October 2013)
 White-goods giant Fagor goes into administration (October 2013)
Cooperation for Economic Success. The Mondragon Case (2011) in Analyse & Kritik, 33 (1), 157–170 . Ramon Flecha & Iñaqui Santa Cruz.http://www.analyse-und-kritik.net/en/abstracts_current.php#562
Making Mondragon: The Growth and Dynamics of the Worker Cooperative Complex (1991), William Whyte. 
We Build the Road as We Travel: Mondragon, A Cooperative Social System, Roy Morrison. 
The Mondragon Cooperative Experience (1993), J. Ormachea.
Cooperation at Work: The Mondragon Experience (1983), K. Bradely & A. Gelb.
Values at Work: Employees participation meets market pressure at Mondragon (1999), G. Cheney.
Mondragon: An economic analysis (1982), C. Logan & H. Thomas.
The Myth of Mondragon: Cooperatives, Politics, and Working-Class Life in a Basque Town (1996), by Sharryn Kasmir, State University of New York Press.
From Mondragon to America: Experiments in Community Economic Development (1997), by G. MacLeod, University College of Cape Breton Press. 
"Jobs of Our Own: Building a Stakeholder Society" (1999), by Race Mathews, Pluto Press (Australia) and Comerford & Miller (London). . US reprint 2009, The Distributist Review Press. .
 "Rag Radio: Carl Davidson on Mondragon and Workers' Cooperatives," The Rag Blog, September 15, 2011 Interview by Thorne Dreyer (44:05)
 Articles about the Mondragon Corporation on The Rag Blog

 
Basque companies
Cooperative federations
Conglomerate companies established in 1956
Spanish companies established in 1956
Gipuzkoa